Johannes Semm (also Johannes or Johan Semmiste; 20 July 1882 Koiola Parish, Võru County – 22 February 1942 Kirov Oblast, Russia) was an Estonian politician. He was a member of I Riigikogu. He was a member of the Riigikogu since 7 January 1921. He replaced Jaan Kriisa. On 4 December 1922, he resigned his position and he was replaced by Karl Piirisild.

References

1882 births
1942 deaths
Members of the Riigikogu, 1920–1923